Sugar Falls: A Residential School Story is a young adult graphic novel written by David A. Robertson, illustrated by Scott B. Henderson and Donovan Yaciuk, and published  January 22, 2012 by HighWater Press.

The book "is based on the true story of Betty Ross, Elder from Cross Lake First Nation."

Reception 
Sugar Falls received positive reviews from CM: Canadian Review of Materials, CBC Books, and Anishinabek News. The book was also shortlisted for the First Nation Communities READ Award (2012).

References

External links 

 48 books by Indigenous writers to read to understand residential schools
 A residential school survivor's story that became a successful graphic novel celebrates its 10th anniversary

See also 

2012 children's books
2012 graphic novels
Canadian children's books
Works about residential schools in Canada
Novels set in Canada
Books about indigenous peoples